Wallack is a surname, and may refer to:

Franz Wallack (1887–1966), Austrian civil engineer.
James William Wallack (c. 1794–1864), English-American actor
John Lester Wallack (1820–1888), American actor, son of James W. 
Henry John Wallack (1790–1870), British actor and stage manager
Melisa Wallack, American screenwriter and film director
Susan Wallack (née Johnston) (1793-1851), English-American actress

See also
Wallack's Theatre, name of several New York theatres
 Wallach (disambiguation)
 Wallachia (disambiguation)
 Oláh (disambiguation)
 Volokh (disambiguation), an alternate spelling (East Slavic)